The Lyamin is a river in Khanty-Mansi Autonomous Okrug, Russia, a right tributary of the Ob.

References

Rivers of Khanty-Mansi Autonomous Okrug